Swami Vivekananda University may refer to—
 Chhattisgarh Swami Vivekanand Technical University, a university in Chhattisgarh, India
 Ramakrishna Mission Vivekananda Educational and Research Institute, a university located in Belur, West Bengal
 Swami Vivekananda University, Barrackpore, a Private University located in Barrackpore, West Bengal
 Swami Vivekanand University, Madhya Pradesh, a university located in Madhya Pradesh, India
 Swami Vivekanand Subharti University, a university located in Uttar Pradesh, India